Nagornaya is a Moscow Metro station on the Serpukhovsko-Timiryazevskaya Line dug at a depth of 9 meters, which handles about 17,200 people each day.

Design
Between Nagornaya and Nagatinskaya stations there is a dead end spur between the tracks used for diversion of traffic in case of power failure and for technical vehicles traffic at night.
Nagornaya was built according to the typical project of that times, with 26 columns in two rows at the distance 6.5 meters between columns.

Exit
The exit to the city from Nagornaya is through an underground passage to the Electrolytnaya Passage and Krivoy Rog street.

References
 «Нагорная» Nagornaya at the official Moscow Metro site
 News pertaining to the station

Moscow Metro stations
Railway stations in Russia opened in 1983
Serpukhovsko-Timiryazevskaya Line
Railway stations located underground in Russia